The 2003 Women's Australian Hockey League was the 11th edition women's field hockey tournament. The tournament was held in various cities across Australia, and was contested from 7 March through to 13 April 2003.

VIS Vipers won the tournament for the first time after defeating QLD Scorchers 4–3 in penalties, after the final finished as a 3–3 draw. Canberra Strikers finished in third place after defeating WA Diamonds 4–3 in the third and fourth place playoff.

Participating teams

 Canberra Strikers
 NSWIS Arrows
 Territory Pearls
 QLD Scorchers
 Adelaide Suns
 Tassie Van Demons
 VIS Vipers
 WA Diamonds

Competition format
The 2003 Women's Australian Hockey League consisted of a single round robin format, followed by classification matches.

Teams from all 8 states and territories competed against one another throughout the pool stage. At the conclusion of the pool stage, the top four ranked teams progressed to the semi-finals, while the bottom four teams continued to the classification stage.

The first four rounds of the pool stage comprised two-legged fixtures between states. As a result, matches in rounds five to seven of the pool stage were worth double points, due to the single-leg format.

Point allocation

Every match in the 2003 AHL needed an outright result. In the event of a draw, golden goal extra time was played out, and if the result was still a draw a penalty shoot-out was contested, with the winner receiving a bonus point.

Results

Preliminary round

Fixtures

Classification round

Fifth to eighth place classification

Crossover

Seventh and eighth place

Fifth and sixth place

First to fourth place classification

Semi-finals

Third and fourth place

Final

Awards

Statistics

Final standings

Goalscorers

References

External links

2003
2003 in Australian women's field hockey